Events from the year 1695 in art.

Events
 French painter Évrard Chauveau travels to Sweden to work on the palaces of Queen Ulrike Eleonora.
 François Girardon becomes "chancelier" of the Académie Royale de Peinture et de Sculpture.

Paintings

 Ludolf Bakhuizen – Warships in a Heavy Storm
 Mei Qing – Two Immortals on Huangshan
 Sebastiano Ricci – Phineas and the Sons of Boreas
 Hyacinthe Rigaud
 Christ Atoning on the Cross (two versions)
 Portrait of the Artist's mother (Musée du Louvre)
 Godfried Schalcken – Self-Portrait by Candlelight

Births
 May 2 – Giovanni Niccolò Servandoni, French architect and painter (died 1766)
 June 24 – Martin van Meytens, Austrian portrait painter (died 1770)
 August 11 – Michelangelo Unterberger, Austrian painter of religious themes (died 1758)
 December 19 – Andrea Locatelli, Italian painter of landscapes (vedute) (died 1741)
 December 29 – Jean-Baptiste Pater, French rococo painter (died 1736)
 date unknown
 François Boch, ceramicist, co-founder of Villeroy & Boch (died 1794)
 Miguel Cabrera, indigenous Zapotec painter, (died 1768)
 Elias Gottlob Haussmann, German painter (died 1774)
 Juste-Aurèle Meissonnier, French goldsmith, sculptor, painter, architect, and furniture designer (died 1750)
 Johan Ross the Elder, Swedish painter (died 1773)
 probable
 Francesco Pavona, Italian painter primarily of pastel portraits (died 1777)
 Louis-François Roubiliac, French sculptor (died 1762)

Deaths
 January 16 – Hans Adam Weissenkircher, Austrian Baroque court painter (born 1646)
 April 3 – Melchior d'Hondecoeter, Dutch painter of exotic birds in a park-like landscape (born 1636)
 April 12 – Jean-Baptiste Corneille, French painter, etcher, and engraver (born 1646)
 May – Cornelis de Heem, still-life painter associated with both Flemish Baroque and Dutch Golden Age painting (born 1631)
 May 9 – Lambert van Haven, Danish painter, architect and master builder (born 1630)
 May 29 – Giuseppe Recco, Italian painter (born 1634)
 May 30 – Pierre Mignard, French painter (born 1605)
 August 8 – Carel de Vogelaer, Dutch still life painter (born 1653)
 date unknown
 Fabrizio Chiari, painter and engraver (born 1621)
 Jean-Gilles Delcour, Flemish religious painter (born 1632)
 Enkū, Japanese Buddhist monk and sculptor during the early Edo period (born 1632)
 Henri Testelin, French court painter (born 1616)
 probable
 Valerio Baldassari, Italian painter (born 1650)
 Jan Thopas, Dutch portraitist (born 1627)

References

 
Years of the 17th century in art
1690s in art